Brynley Jones (born 16 May 1959) is a Welsh former professional footballer who played in The Football League for Chester as a midfielder. He was born in St Asaph.

Playing career
A product of Chester's youth policy, Jones made his professional debut on the final day of 1976–77 away at Swindon Town. He remained involved in the first-team squad over the next five years, with one of the highlights coming in Chester's FA Cup fifth round tie at Ipswich Town in 1979–80 when Jones scored to give his side a shock lead. The following season saw him score an unusual goal away at Colchester United, when an attempted defensive clearance struck his shins and rebounded into the net from distance.

Jones' final Chester appearance was also his last Football League outing, in Chester's 1–0 home defeat to Carlisle United in May 1982. The end of the season saw him follow manager John Cottam to Scarborough, where he played for one season in the Alliance Premier League.

He later played for clubs including Bangor City and Oswestry Town.

Personal life

His son, Craig Jones, is also a professional footballer in the Football League with Bury and has been capped by Wales at semi-professional level.

Bibliography

References

1959 births
Living people
Welsh footballers
Sportspeople from St Asaph
English Football League players
National League (English football) players
Association football midfielders
Chester City F.C. players
Scarborough F.C. players
Bangor City F.C. players
Oswestry Town F.C. players
Colwyn Bay F.C. players
Oswestry Town F.C. managers
Welsh football managers